Castilho is a municipality in the state of São Paulo, in Brazil.

This is a list of mayors from Castilho.

Presidents of the City Hall

Victório Simonetti - 1955–1956
Bellarmino da Silva França - 1957
Magide Jorge - 1958
Djaniro Maciel de Oliveira - 1959–1960
Djaniro Maciel de Oliveira - 1961–1962
José Alexandre Trindade - 1963–1964
Cid of Jesus Leite Penteado - 1965–1966
Cid of Jesus Leite Penteado - 1967
Aylton D’Ângelo - 1968–1969
José Jorge Zahr  - 1970–1971
Aylton D’Ângelo - 1972
Lourival da Cruz - 1973–1974
Mytio Shinohara - 1975–1976
Ademar Peixoto Martins - 1977–1978
Adão Severino Batista - 1979–1980
Milton Brito Neves - 1981–1982
Vicente Firmino da Silva - 1983–1984
Adão Severino Batista - 1985
Jailton Pereira de Souza - 1986
Manoel Ortiz - 1987–1988
Antonio Nilson Pontim - 1989–1990
 Jailton Pereira de Souza - 1991–1992
Nilson Soares da Natividade - 1993–1994
Valdir Camilo de Azevedo - 1995–1996
João Roberto Lameu - 1997–1998
Daniel Batista de Oliveira - 1999–2000
Vitor Sotini - 2001–2002
Valdenir Bispo dos Santos - 2003–2004
Carlos Roberto de Oliveira - 2005–2006
Carlos Roberto de Oliveira - 2007–2008
Daniel Batista de Oliveira - 2009–2010
Sebastião Reis de Oliveira - 2011–2012
Wagner de Souza Oliveira - 2013–2014
Wagner de Souza Oliveira - 2015–2016
Sebastião Reis de Oliveira - 2017–2018
Sebastião Reis de Oliveira - 2019–2020
Ailton Pereira de Souza - 2021–2022
Ailton Pereira de Souza - 2023–2024

References

Populated places established in 1934
Municipalities in São Paulo (state)